The Gen. Isaac Peace Rodman House is an historic house in South Kingstown, Rhode Island.  It is a -story granite structure built in 1855 by Isaac P. Rodman, a prominent politician and businessman who served as a general in the Union Army during the American Civil War.  In addition to its association with Rodman, the house is notable as an excellent early Italianate design based on the published works of Andrew Jackson Downing, and its attractively landscaped grounds.

The house was listed on the National Register of Historic Places in 1990.

See also
National Register of Historic Places listings in Washington County, Rhode Island

References

Houses in South Kingstown, Rhode Island
Houses on the National Register of Historic Places in Rhode Island
National Register of Historic Places in Washington County, Rhode Island
Italianate architecture in Rhode Island
Houses completed in 1855